Cyclops is an Australian manufacturer of toys, primarily known for children's pedal cars. The business was founded by John Heine Sheet Metal at Leichhardt, New South Wales in 1913. The name Cyclops was registered in 1915 and the company continued to grow during the 1920s and the Great Depression. In 1946 the company name was officially changed to Cyclops Pty Ltd, but it was taken over by a British company after World War II.

In 1963 Cyclops Pty Ltd celebrated its 50th anniversary by winning the Australian Wheel toy of the year. It had previously won several Australian Toy of the Year and Wheel Toy of the Year awards.

In the 1970s that company was facing bankruptcy and was taken over by another British company. In the late 1980s the toys were being manufactured offshore, but it was returned to Australian ownership when purchased by Hunter Toyline Pty Ltd (Now Hunter Leisure Pty Ltd) in 1992.

Enthusiasts 
Cyclops Toys were  a major part of Australian childhood.  Although the original style of toy is no longer available their appeal has continued as they are viewed as Australian icons and for many bring back memories of childhood.  Groups such as Pedalmania which began in Luddenham  Sydney in 1997 collect information and photographs which bring happy memories of childhood in Australia.

See also
List of Australian bicycle brands and manufacturers

References

Further reading
 
 Flivver, tricycle design propelled by using arms to push a lever. Manufactured by Cyclops Toy Company in Australia between 1924 and 1929

External links

Australian companies established in 1913
Manufacturing companies established in 1913
Toy companies established in 1913
1992 mergers and acquisitions
Manufacturing companies based in Sydney
Toy companies of Australia
Cycle manufacturers of Australia
Kick scooters